Strieber is a surname. Notable people with the surname include:

 Anne Strieber (1946–2015), American author, wife of Whitley Strieber
 Whitley Strieber (born 1945), American author

See also
 Stieber